Abdul-Wasa Taha Al-Saqqaf (born 12 February 1974) is a Yemeni writer, poet, researcher, analyst and translator who was born in Al-Hadharim village in Taiz - Republic of Yemen.

Early years

The Al-Saqqaf family is a Ba'Alawi Sayyed family of the Banu Hashim of Hadhrami origin who lived in Tarim City in Hadhramaut, Yemen.

Writings 
Al-Saqqaf's writings are classical and focus on social issues. They also have some of the modern poetry features such as breakdown of social norms and cultural sureties, dislocation of meaning and sense from its normal context, valorization of the despairing individual in the face of an unmanageable future disillusionment, rejection of history and the substitution of a mythical past, and stream of consciousness. His poetry also displays a vivid sense of humor.

Al-Saqqaf excelled in the field of professional artificial translation specifically translating poetry into poetry and published most of his works online. He also wrote social, political and economical researches. Two of his poem collection were issued and published; the first is entitled Alaa What Next  and the other is The Mirage Man.

References

Yemeni poets
Living people
1974 births
Taiz University alumni
Sanaa University alumni